The 2011 Manitoba Lotteries Women's Curling Classic was held October 21 to 24 at the Fort Rouge Curling Club in Winnipeg, Manitoba. It was the second women's Grand Slam event of the 2011–12 curling season and the eighth time the tournament has been held. The purse was CAD$60,000, which the winning team of Renée Sonnenberg won and took home CAD$15,000.

Teams

Knockout Draw Brackets

A event

B event

C event

Knockout results

Draw 1
October 21, 9:00 AM CT

Draw 2
October 21, 12:00 PM CT

Draw 3
October 21, 3:00 PM CT

Draw 4
October 21, 6:00 PM CT

Draw 5
October 21, 9:00 PM CT

Draw 6
October 22, 9:00 AM CT

Draw 7
October 22, 12:00 PM CT

Draw 8
October 22, 3:00 PM CT

Draw 9
October 22, 6:00 PM CT

Draw 10
October 22, 9:00 PM CT

Draw 11
October 23, 9:00 AM CT

Draw 12
October 22, 12:30 PM CT

Draw 13
October 23, 4:00 PM CT

Draw 14
October 23, 7:30 PM CT

Playoffs

Quarterfinals
October 24, 10:00 AM CT

Semifinals
October 24, 1:30 PM CT

Final
October 24, 5:00 PM CT

External links

Manitoba Lotteries Women's Curling Classic
Manitoba Lotteries Women's Curling Classic
Manitoba Lotteries Women's Curling Classic
Curling competitions in Winnipeg